Evaldo Rodrigues Goncalves (born 10 January 1981 in Goiânia, Brazil) is a Brazilian footballer, best known as striker played for Hoang Anh Gia Lai F.C. in V.League 1.

Club career
Born in Goiânia, Evaldo was a youth player for Goiás, is a Brazilian sports club, 
He started his career with Xiamen Lanshi before to moving on to other clubs such as Uniao Bandeirante, Caldense, America RJ and Joinville. Joinville was later disbanded after relegated from Serie C in 2008 and Evaldo switched to V-League at that time.

When Evaldo joined HAGL in 2009, he was regarded as cover for another Brazilian striker Agostinho, who had been the club's main scorer since 2008. Nevertheless, Agostinho was suddenly fired due to a conflict with Lee Nguyen, a new signing (who was also fired early this year) at that point of time. The departure of Agostinho meant HAGL had no more choice but Evaldo in forward position. When the chances came, he made it to score 11 goals in V-League 2009 and some of them were extremely important ones.

After a successful season, at least for himself, Evaldo decided to bring his whole family to Vietnam in order to focus more on his job. Regarding his contribution since the beginning of 2010 season, HAGL board are understandably happy, not only because of his goals but also his professional behaviour. He is becoming a new symbol of the club on Central Highland.

Honours

Clubs

HAGL
V.League 1
Runners-up : 2010
Third place : 2014

References

1981 births
Living people
Sportspeople from Goiânia
Brazilian footballers
Association football forwards
Xiamen Blue Lions players
União Bandeirante Futebol Clube players
Associação Atlética Caldense players
Joinville Esporte Clube players
Hoang Anh Gia Lai FC players
Terengganu F.C. II players
Campeonato Brasileiro Série C players
V.League 1 players
Malaysia Premier League players
Brazilian expatriate footballers
Brazilian expatriate sportspeople in China
Brazilian expatriate sportspeople in Vietnam
Brazilian expatriate sportspeople in Malaysia
Expatriate footballers in China
Expatriate footballers in Vietnam
Expatriate footballers in Malaysia
21st-century Brazilian people